Shannon Bolin (January 1, 1917 – March 25, 2016) was an American actress and singer. A March 10, 1941, article in The Mason City Globe-Gazette said that she was "known as 'The Lady with the Dark Blue Voice'".

Early years
Ione Shannon Bolin was born in Spencer, South Dakota, on Jan. 1, 1917. Her parents were Gracie Elsie Bolin and Harry Bolin, a hotel owner who raised horses during the Depression. In an interview she said her father named her Ione "because I was born on the first of January, which is 1-1, or 1-one. That's South Dakota humor for you.”

At age 20, she headed to the East Coast to pursue a career as a singer. In Washington, D.C., Bolin worked for CBS Radio and during World War II she became the host of her own musical program. She auditioned in 1944 in New York for the New Opera Company and won a place in the ensemble.

Stage
Bolin portrayed Meg Boyd in both the original Broadway production and the film version of Damn Yankees.

Her other stage roles include The Golden Apple (as Mrs. Juniper), Only in America (as Kate Golden), The Student Gypsy (as Zampa Allescu) Take Me Along (as Lily), Xmas in Las Vegas (as Eleanor Wellspot), and Helen Goes to Troy, for which she used the pseudonym Anne Bolin.

Bolin worked with Marc Blitzstein on Regina the opera based on The Little Foxes. She played the alternate lead when the work debuted on Broadway.

Film
In addition to the film version of Damn Yankees, Bolin's other film appearances include If Ever I See You Again (1978) and the low-budget horror film The Children (1980).

Radio
Bolin did radio work in New York City for the Theatre Guild of the Air production of Allegro. She sang Brahms lieder on WQXR for the Stromberg-Carlson series.

In the early 1940s, she was a regular singer on the CBS program Your Town and Ours.

Television
Bolin appeared on television in the NBC Opera Theatre production of Suor Angelica, in which she played the Princess, and the Jackie Gleason Show, a special titled "The Christmas List" as Gleason's wife.

Recording
In 1955, Bolin recorded "an album of seldom-heard songs by top composers" for Vanguard Records. She and her husband "dug through thousands of 'long-lost' tunes by top composers like Gershwin, Kern, Rodgers, and came up with 12 which they call Rare Wine".

Personal life and death
Bolin married Milton Kaye (1909–2006), a New York pianist, composer and arranger, in 1946. Kaye and Bolin recorded an album, Rare Wine. In 2002, the couple appeared together in a commercial for DeBeers diamonds. She died at the age of 99 on March 25, 2016.

References

External links

1917 births
2016 deaths
American stage actresses
American musical theatre actresses
American opera singers
American radio actresses
Actresses from South Dakota
People from McCook County, South Dakota
Place of death missing
21st-century American women